The Mráz M-3 Bonzo was a light aircraft built in Czechoslovakia in 1948 as a further development in the family of light aircraft that had commenced with the M-1 Sokol.

Design and development
The Bonzo was based on the Sokol airframe, but with a redesigned wing and substantial changes to the fuselage. These included lengthening it to allow for the addition of a fourth seat, reducing the height of the rear fuselage to allow for a new cabin with all-around visibility, and the addition of a semi-retractable nosewheel in place of a tailwheel.

Funding for the construction of two prototypes was not approved by the Department of Transport, but designer Rublič was able to raise the money elsewhere to build one prototype, which flew in April 1948. It was hoped that production could begin in 1950, and the Bonzo was exhibited at the 1949 Paris Air Show. No sales resulted, however, and the prototype was flown for a while by the Institute of Cartography in Bratislava before being handed over for aeroclub use in 1952.

In 1961, the Bonzo was flown to set a number of national speed records, but was withdrawn from use soon afterwards.

Specifications

See also

References

 
 
 

1940s Czechoslovakian civil utility aircraft
Bonzo
Single-engined tractor aircraft
Low-wing aircraft
Aircraft first flown in 1948